Brachylinga is a genus of stiletto flies in the family Therevidae. There are at least 20 described species in Brachylinga.

Species
These 28 species belong to the genus Brachylinga:

 Brachylinga albifrons Webb, 2006 c g
 Brachylinga albiseta (Malloch, 1932) c g
 Brachylinga antennata (Krober, 1911) c
 Brachylinga attenuata Webb, 2006 c g
 Brachylinga baccata (Coquillett, 1893) i c g
 Brachylinga bicolor Webb, 2006 c g
 Brachylinga chilensis (Macquart, 1840) c g
 Brachylinga cinerea (Cole, 1923) i c g
 Brachylinga clausa (Kroeber, 1929) c g
 Brachylinga concava Webb, 2006 c g
 Brachylinga curacaoensis Webb, 2006 c g
 Brachylinga divaricata Webb, 2006 c g
 Brachylinga fraterna (Krober, 1911) c g
 Brachylinga laculata Webb, 2006 c g
 Brachylinga mexicana Webb, 2006 c g
 Brachylinga mimica Webb, 2006 c g
 Brachylinga morata (Coquillett, 1893) i c g
 Brachylinga obscura (Coquillett, 1893) i
 Brachylinga ornata (Krober, 1911) c g
 Brachylinga ornatifrons (Krober, 1911) c
 Brachylinga pavida (Coquillett, 1893) i c g b
 Brachylinga pilosa (Krober, 1914) i g
 Brachylinga punctifrons (Kroeber, 1914) c g
 Brachylinga sericeifrons (Krober, 1928) c g
 Brachylinga squamosa (Hardy, 1943) i
 Brachylinga tepocae (Cole, 1923) i c g
 Brachylinga tridentata Webb, 2006 c g
 Brachylinga xanthoperna Irwin & Webb, 1992 c g

Data sources: i = ITIS, c = Catalogue of Life, g = GBIF, b = Bugguide.net

References

Further reading

 

Therevidae
Articles created by Qbugbot
Asiloidea genera